The Church of the Epiphany is an Orthodox Church on Gutuevsky Island, Saint Petersburg. 

It was designed by Vasily Kosyakov and built in 1888.

References

Russian Orthodox churches in Saint Petersburg
Church buildings with domes
Cultural heritage monuments of regional significance in Saint Petersburg